The International Resource Privilege is the power to transfer ownership or freely dispose of  the natural resources of a country by the authority that countries give to the current leadership or government of that country. The resource privilege exists regardless of how the rulers came to power. While bribery is often illegal, the purchase of these resources by payment to the current government in control is legal. Corrupt leaders sell these resources to generate revenue which entrenches the corrupt government and incentivizing the seizure of power itself. This further handicaps the ability to achieve democracy along with hindering economic growth and the eradication of poverty.

Cause 
Some academics argue that International Resource Privilege remains because arrangements between global institutions tend to be struck without adequate concern for their thoroughgoing effects on the global poor. One example is that it provides additional incentive to overthrowing governments, which in turn contributes to a cycle of political instability where a promising government might just as soon be toppled as a brutal military regime. There is little incentive for foreign governments to challenge the situation because they benefit from it.  The Washington Post quotes Thomas Pogge as saying “most of us do not merely let people starve, but also participate in starving them.”  We elect officials that let the corporations buy the natural resources that should belong to the people is the argument for why we are involved. For example oil wealth and dictatorship go together  as seen in Malaysia, Saudi Arabia, and the United Arab Emirates. This  international economic and political system perpetuates and reproduces poverty in such that western nations have a negative duty not to do harm to the people of these nations.

Example 
ExxonMobil is the largest exporter from Equatorial Guinea, Exxon pays Teodoro Obiang and his family for the oil rights.  Simon Taylor, director of Global Witness said he is "A dictator who has impoverished his citizens and enriched himself and his family by plundering the country's oil wealth" Which leads us to the thought of "What are our moral obligations to these people?", are we responsible for their poverty and human rights violations? Thomas Pogge argues that we are.

Philosophical response 

Mathias Risse calls the resource and borrowing privilege "The Cosmopolitan Complaint". He does acknowledge that the global order provides incentives for it but attributes oppression to the sheer desire to rule. Risse rejects the  belief that the global order Pogge is referring to is shaped by the "sheer existence of states" but Pogge rejects this idea also.

See also 
 Causes of poverty
 Distribution of wealth
 Poor relief
 International inequality

References 

Ethical principles
Poverty
Political corruption